Mack Mason (born 19 January 1996) is an Australian rugby union player who plays as a fly-half for the Austin Gilgronis in the Major League Rugby (MLR).

He previously played for the New South Wales Waratahs in Super Rugby.

Mason made his Super Rugby debut on Sunday, 2 April against the Crusaders.

References

1996 births
Living people
Sportspeople from Cairns
Australian rugby union players
Rugby union players from Queensland
New South Wales Waratahs players
Rugby union fly-halves
Rugby union centres
Queensland Country (NRC team) players
Greater Sydney Rams players
New South Wales Country Eagles players
Austin Gilgronis players